Laune der Natur ("Mood of Nature") is the sixteenth studio album by German band Die Toten Hosen. It was produced by Vincent Sorg and released both as a single and a double album together with the album Learning English Lesson Two on May 5, 2017 on the band's own label JKP. The additional album Learning English Lesson Two contains cover versions in English only and is not available separately.

Tracklist 
Laune der Natur contains 15 German-language titles that deal with the death, loss and transience of relationships. As with the previous studio album Ballast der Republik, some of the lyrics are a collaboration between Campino, the band's front man, and the hip-hop musician Marteria. The music title Unter den Wolken was added to the album as the first single in April 2017. Urknall ("Big Bang") – 2:28 (Musik: Michael Breitkopf, Andreas Meurer /Text: Campino, Marteria)
 Alles mit nach Hause ("Everything Home") – 3:18 (Andreas von Holst, Vincent Sorg / Campino)
 Wannsee – 3:04 (von Holst, Sorg, Meurer / Campino, Marteria)
 Unter den Wolken ("Under the Clouds") – 3:34 (Andreas von Holst / Campino, Marteria)
 Pop & Politik ("Pop & Politics") – 2:53 (Tobias Kuhn, Campino / Campino)
 Laune der Natur ("Mood of Nature") – 3:25 (Campino, Marteria / Jadu Laciny, Marteria, Campino)
 Energie ("Energy") – 2:47 (Campino, Breitkopf / Marteria, Campino)
 Alles passiert ("Everything happens") – 4:07 (Meurer, Sorg, Meurer / Campino, Marteria)
 Die Schöne und das Biest ("The Beauty and the Beast") – 3:30 (Campino / Campino, Marteria)
 Eine Handvoll Erde ("A handful of soil") – 4:40 (Andreas von Holst, Meurer / Campino)
 Wie viele Jahre (Hasta la Muerte) ("How many Years (until Death)")– 3:14 (Breitkopf / Campino)
 ICE nach Düsseldorf ("ICE to Düsseldorf") – 2:10 (Meurer, Kuhn / Campino)
 Geisterhaus ("Haunted House") – 3:14 (von Holst / Campino, Marteria)
 Lass los ("Let go") – 3:28 (Breitkopf / Campino)
 Kein Grund zur Traurigkeit ("No Reason for Sadness") – 3:59 (Wolfgang Rohde and Cäpt’n Suurbier)

Personnel 

 Campino – vocals
 Andreas von Holst – electric guitar
 Michael Breitkopf – electric guitar
 Andreas Meurer – bass guitar
 Vom Ritchie – drums

Certifications

References

External links 

German-language albums
2017 albums
Die Toten Hosen albums